Diane Willis ( Bruhn) (born  July 4, 1948) is an American journalist, documentalist, teacher and newscaster.

Career as a broadcaster 
Willis graduated Phi Beta Kappa from Augustana College and earned several master's degrees from both the University of Chicago and University of Missouri. She spent six years teaching English and journalism before becoming a broadcast journalist. During 1981-82 her first job was at KTVI in St. Louis, Missouri, where she reported and anchored. By 1983, she moved to Boston's WNEV-TV, where she started as a reporter and soon became the main female anchor alongside veteran reporter Tom Ellis, to lead the 6:00 pm news hour, by that time a strong third place in the ratings. The newscast received good reviews from the critics during her tenure; although she stepped down in 1986. She then taught Journalism at Northeastern University for a few semesters alongside her then-husband Jim Willis. Soon after, in January 1987, she joined WRTV in Indianapolis as the 6:00 and 11:00 pm anchor with Clyde Lee. They would remain as the principal faces of the news division until 2001, when both agreed to resign and left the television news business. With Lee, she began a new consultant firm named Lee-Willis Communications, specializing in public relations, crisis communications and training corporate executives to deal with the media. This firm had a mild controversy when WRTV reported that the former anchors had received $30,000 from a high school to make public relations related releases. Willis replied that they couldn't do any more for them.

Personal life 
Diane and Jim Willis married in the early 1980s, and in 1983, they adopted two sons, David and John. The couple divorced. Willis and Clyde Lee married in 2000.

References

Television anchors from Boston
American television reporters and correspondents
American women television journalists
Living people
1948 births
21st-century American women